Sasha and Sirozha was a Belarusian multimedial comical duo formed by musician Siarhei Mikhalok and artist  Aliaksei Hatskevich. Later their team included Matvey Saburov (Матвей Сабуров) for technical support. Their activities are broad in nature and include TV series, radio series, comics, and music albums. In 2008 Mikhalok put the project on hold, to focus on working in the rock group Lyapis Trubetskoy.

"Sasha" is a diminutive from the name Aleksandr (Alexander), Sirozha is a trasianka corruption of "Seryozha," a diminutive from the name Sergey (Sergius, Serge).

The image of Sasha and Sirozha is that of not very bright youth, comparable to Beavis and Butt-head.

History

Miklalok described the origins of the project as follows. "Some time ago we drew comic strips with characters who were two real Belarusian guys, Sasha and Sirozha, and they could be described as being in transition between country hicks and city bums. They are versed in music, know rap and metal, can discourse on many serious issues of modern times. The friends roam Minsk and end up in various comical accidents". Representatives of the First Musical Channel noticed these and suggested to bring them to film, which led to their first TV series, Kalykhanka ("Lullaby").  

Since 2000 Kalykhanka was produced by the Belarusian First Musical TV Channel, since 2004 it was produced by TV channel M1, Kiev, Ukraine. In 2006 it was ranked third in nomination "TV Series" for the prize "Teletriumph" by the Ukrainian National Council on TV and Radio.

Literature

References

Comedy duos
Belarusian comedy
Comedy musicians
Comedy theatre characters
Comedy radio characters
Comedy television characters
Male characters in theatre
Male characters in radio
Male characters in television